Koshelikha is a rural locality (a village) in Kupriyanovskoye Rural Settlement, Gorokhovetsky District, Vladimir Oblast, Russia. The population was 27 as of 2010.

Geography 
Koshelikha is located on the Suvoroshch, 14 km southeast of Gorokhovets (the district's administrative centre) by road. Yurovo is the nearest rural locality.

References 

Rural localities in Gorokhovetsky District